"Explosions" is a song by English singer and songwriter Ellie Goulding from her second studio album, Halcyon (2012). Written by Goulding and John Fortis, it was released as a promotional single on iTunes Ireland on 3 August 2012 and on iTunes UK on 1 October 2012, but was removed shortly thereafter on both occasions. In late January 2013, it was announced that the track would be released as the official third single from the album. The official music video premiered on 30 January 2013 and consists of exclusive live footage of Goulding from The Halcyon Days Tour.

Commercial performance
Following its use on ITV's "Where Drama Lives" advertisement, "Explosions" debuted at number 122 on the UK Singles Chart for the week ending 26 January 2013, jumping to number thirty-three the following week on sales of 9,851 copies. In its sixth week, the song rose to its peak position of number thirteen, selling 24,269 copies. The single had sold over 200,000 copies in the UK as of August 2013, and was certified silver by the British Phonographic Industry (BPI) on 20 September 2013.

"Explosions" entered the Billboard Hot 100 at number 100 on the issue dated 1 March 2014, following the song's use in television commercials for the American film Endless Love.

Personnel
Credits adapted from the liner notes of Halcyon.

 Ellie Goulding – vocals
 Ben Baptie – mixing assistant
 Tom Elmhirst – mixing
 John Fortis – keyboards, production, programming
 Ashley Krajewski – additional programming, engineering
 Kirsty Mangan – violin
 George Murphy – engineering

Charts

Weekly charts

Year-end charts

Certifications

References

2012 songs
2013 singles
Ellie Goulding songs
Polydor Records singles
2010s ballads
Pop ballads
Songs written by Ellie Goulding